Emanuel Horvatiček (born 22 June 1979 in Osijek, Osijek-Baranja) is a Croatian sprint canoer who competed in the mid-2000s. He competed at the 2004 Summer Olympics in Athens, but eliminated in the semifinals of the C-1 500 m and the C-1 1000 m events.

References
Sports-Reference.com profile

1979 births
Canoeists at the 2004 Summer Olympics
Croatian male canoeists
Living people
Olympic canoeists of Croatia
Sportspeople from Osijek